is a private Christian university in Shibuya, Tokyo, Japan. Originally established in 1874 by missionaries from the Methodist Episcopal Church, it was reconfigured in its current form in 1949 as part of Aoyama Gakuin. Aoyama Gakuin University had its 140th anniversary in 2014 and is one of Japan's oldest higher education facilities.

The university's undergraduate and graduate programs include courses on literature, law, economics, business, international politics, economics, communication, science, engineering and cultural studies. The university graduate programs include international management, law and professional accounting.

Aoyama Gakuin University has participated in Hakone Ekiden, an annual university relay race between Tokyo and Hakone in Japan. Recently they won the races in 2015, 2016, 2017, 2018, 2020, and 2022.

General information 
The main campus, located in Omotesando in central Tokyo, is complemented by the Sagamihara Campus in Kanagawa Prefecture. The latter houses the College of Science and Sports. The university has graduated around 180,000 students and employs over 1,600 full and part-time faculty members. Aoyama Gakuin University is accredited by the British University Association and is a member of the British Association of Private College and Universities.

The university maintains a number of active international exchange programs for students and faculty. Many of the students and faculty have attended universities and research institutes abroad, while the institution itself has attracted numerous outstanding scholars and students from around the world to its campuses.

Organization

Undergraduate programs
 College of Literature
 College of Education, Psychology and Human Studies
 College of Economics
 Faculty of Law
 School of Business
 School of  International Politics, Economics and Communication (SIPEC)
 School of Cultural and Creative Studies
 College of Science and Engineering
 School of Social Informatics
 School of Global Studies and Collaboration
 College of Community Studies (started in 2019)
 The Aoyama Standard University-Wide Universal Education System

Graduate programs
 Graduate School of Literature
 Graduate School of Education, Psychology and Human Studies
 Graduate School of Economics
 Graduate School of Law
 Graduate School of Business
 Graduate School of International Politics, Economics and Communication
 Graduate School of Cultural and Creative Studies
 Graduate School of Science and Engineering
 Graduate School of Social Informatics
 Graduate School of International Management (MBA)
 Law School
 Graduate School of Professional Accountancy

Research institutes
 Research Institute of Aoyama Gakuin University
 Economics Research Center
 Business Law Research Center
 SACRE
 Global Business Research Center
 Global Politics and Economy Research Center
 Information Science Research Center
 WTO Research Center
 Center for Advanced Technology
 Center for Machinery Analysis

Campus
 Aoyama Campus (4-4-25, Shibuya, Shibuya, Tokyo)
 Includes two registered Tangible Cultural Properties, "Majima Memorial Hall（間島記念館）" and "Berry Hall".
 Sagamihara Campus (5-10-1, Fuchinobe, Sagamihara, Kanagawa)
 Midorigaoka Ground (2-6097-1, Midorigaoka, Sagamihara, Kanagawa)
 Machida Ground (1571, Kotani, Onoji-cho, Machida, Tokyo)

AGU Gymnasium 

AGU Gymnasium is an arena in Aoyama campus. It is the home arena of the Sun Rockers Shibuya of the B.League, Japan's professional basketball league.

Rankings 

The school ranks 11th in the country in the number of alumni elected to the National Diet, and 13th in the number of alumni holding executive-level positions in the country with listed companies. Its graduates rank 8th in Japan in the number of successful passings of the national CPA exam.

The university is also on the list of top 20 most popular universities in Tokyo. The main campus is located in the Shibuya area, and the students are generally viewed as having come from more affluent backgrounds and are regarded as sophisticated.  The school has been lauded for its undergraduate focus on the humanities and business education. 

In the 2020–2021 University Brand Image Survey conducted by Nikkei BP Consulting, Aoyama Gakuin University ranked 5th overall in the Greater Tokyo Area and 4th out of the private universities after Waseda, Keio, and Sophia Universities.

 QS World university rankings 201: 701＋
 Modern Languages 201: 151–200
 QS Asian university rankings 201: 201–250

Professors
 Robert March (International business)
 Kumiko Haba (Political science, International Relations)
 Karl-Friedrich Lenz (German law, EU Law)
 Masami Sumiyoshi (Philosophy of law)
 Noritada Matsuda (Politics, Political science)
 Yoshikazu Miki (Tax law, president of the university)
 Akira Ishii (Criminology)
 Junichi Kikuchi (Intellectual property law)
 Munehide Nishizawa (Civil procedure, French law)
 Shin Hae Bong (International law)
 Yasunori Osono (Internal medicine)

Notable graduates

Politicians

 Tsuyoshi Takagi (member of the house of representatives, Minister for Reconstruction)
 Kenko Matsuki (member of the house of representatives)
 Shunichi Yamaguchi (member of the house of representatives, Minister of state for science and technology policy)
 Haruko Arimura (member of the House of councilors, Minister in charge of women's activities)
 Renhō (member of the house of councilors, the leader of the Democratic Party of Japan, consumer affairs minister)
 Hiroya Ebina (the mayor of kushiro city)
 Hiroshi Nakada (the former mayor of Yokohama, member of the House of Councillors)

Writers
 Kiyoshi Kawakami (Christian journalist)
 Atsuko Asano (novelist)
 Hideyuki Kikuchi (novelist)
 Fusanosuke Natsume (caricaturist)
 Nejime Shōichi (poet)
 Seiichi Morimura (novelist)
 Shigeaki Kato (novelist)

Film and television
 Yumi Asō (actress)
 Mari Hoshino (actress)
 Naomi Kawashima (actress)
 Horan Chiaki (actress, caster)
 Emi Kobayashi (TV performer)
 Ai Maeda (actress)
 Yōji Matsuda (actor)
 Rie Oh (sports caster)
 Sayaka Ohara (voice actress)
 Ayana Tsubaki (model and TV personality)
 Tetsuya Watari (actor)
 Christel Takigawa (TV announcer)
  Shinobu Terajima (Actress, the Best Actress award at the 60th Berlin Film Festival)

Musicians
 Keisuke Kuwata (musician, leader of Southern All Stars)
 Kazuyuki Sekiguchi (musician, member of Southern All Stars)
 Masato Nakamura (musician, member of Dreams Come True)
 Yuko Hara (musician, member of Southern All Stars)
 Shinji Harada (singer)
 Noriyuki Makihara (singer)
 Love Psychedelico (musician)
 Shigeaki Kato (singer, member of NEWS)
 Stephanie (singer)
 Nana Tanimura (singer)
 Rei Fujita (singer, member of DUSTZ)
 Jun Senoue (musician, member of Crush 40)
 Mari Hamada (singer)
 Alexandros (band) (rock band)

Sports
 Tadahito Iguchi (baseball player)
 Rika Hiraki (tennis player)
 Daisuke Nakajima (auto racing driver)
 Shinsuke Nakamura (professional wrestler)
 Hiroshi Ogawa (baseball player)
 Yosuke Takasu (baseball player)
 Masataka Yoshida (baseball player)

Business
 Hajime Satomi (president of Sega)
 Makoto Fujita (president of CyberAgent)
 Akio Shigemitsu (president of Lotte Korea)
 Ryo Morikawa (president of LINE)
 Shinichi Koide (chairman, president and CEO of Salesforce.com Co., Ltd.)
 Ryuichi Isaka (president of Seven-Eleven Japan Co., Ltd.)
Akiyoshi Koji (president of Asahi Breweries, Ltd.)

Researchers
 Tetsu Tamura (meteorologist, oceanographer)
 Kumiko Haba (political scientist, international relations)
 Masaaki Shirakawa (The 30th governor of the Bank of Japan, economist)
 Eisuke Sakakibara (former vice-minister for finance for international affairs, economist)
 Takenori Inoki (economist, honorary professor of Osaka University)
 Nobuo Ikeda (economist, blogger)
 Hiroyuki Suzuki (Architectural historian)
 Tamostu Aoki (The commissioner of the Agency for Cultural Affairs, director of The National Art Center, Tokyo)

References

External links
 English homepage for Aoyama Gakuin University
 Homepage for Aoyama Gakuin University 

 
Private universities and colleges in Japan
Basketball venues in Japan
Shibuya
Sun Rockers Shibuya
United Church of Christ in Japan
1874 establishments in Japan
Association of Christian Universities and Colleges in Asia
Universities and colleges in Tokyo
Educational institutions established in 1874
Christian universities and colleges in Japan